Anne of Ingleside is a children's novel by Canadian author Lucy Maud Montgomery. It was first published in July 1939 by McClelland and Stewart (Toronto) and the Frederick A. Stokes Company (New York). It is the tenth of eleven books that feature the character of Anne Shirley, and Montgomery's final published novel.

Chronologically, Anne of Ingleside precedes Rainbow Valley, which was published years earlier. In addition, a short story collection The Blythes Are Quoted, written in 1941/42 yet not published until 2009, concludes the Anne stories.

The book's United States copyright was renewed in 1967.

Plot summary 
Seven years after Anne's House of Dreams, Anne visits Diana Wright and her daughter, Anne Cordelia, in Avonlea following the funeral of Gilbert's father. When she returns home to the old Morgan house, now named "Ingleside", she is greeted by her five children: James Matthew ('Jem'), the eldest, now aged seven; Walter Cuthbert, who is about six and often thought to be a bit of a 'sissy' because of his love for poetry; twins Anne ('Nan') and Diana ('Di'), who are five and look nothing alike, Nan with brown hair and hazel eyes, and Di with red hair and green eyes; and finally Shirley, two years old and Susan Baker's favourite, as she took care of him as an infant while Anne was very sick following his birth.

The book includes the dreadful, seemingly eternal visit of Gilbert's disagreeable, oversensitive aunt Mary Maria Blythe, whose visit was only supposed to last two weeks but stretches on for months and who only leaves when Anne unintentionally offends her by arranging a surprise birthday party, much to the relief of the family.

During the novel, which spans a period of about six years, Anne and Gilbert's youngest child is born and is named Bertha Marilla Blythe. She is also called Roly-Poly, or, generally, 'Rilla'. The novel includes a series of adventures which spotlight one of Anne's children at a time as they engage in the misunderstandings and mishaps of youth. In many of the adventures, the honest Ingleside children are taken in by children who tell lies in order to seem more interesting: Nan is deceived by a lying schoolchild into thinking that she was actually switched at birth; Walter is convinced by an older boy that his mother is dying; and Di gets two stories, in both of which she makes friends with schoolgirls who deceive her. In other stories, oldest child Jem deals with the loss of a pet, and youngest child Rilla somehow gets the idea that it is shameful to be seen carrying a cake, and goes to great lengths to avoid doing so. The Blythes' third son Shirley is present in the book, but oddly gets no solo "spotlight" story of his own, which is also the case in Rainbow Valley, the next volume in the series.

At the end of the book, Anne worries that Gilbert has grown distant and possibly doesn't love her anymore. She and Gilbert spend a disagreeable evening with the widowed and childless Christine Stuart, who was once Anne's rival (or so she thought) for Gilbert's love. Suddenly realizing how tired Gilbert looks, Anne begins to wonder if she has been taking Gilbert for granted. At the end she is proven wrong, as Gilbert's lack of attention was caused by worry over one of his patients. He surprises Anne with an anniversary gift and a promise of a trip to Europe for a medical congress.

Series 

Montgomery continued the story of Anne Shirley in a series of sequels. They are listed in the order of Anne's age in each novel.

Editions
  (paperback, 1992)
  (paperback, 2005)

References

External links

 Anne of Ingleside full text along with free PDF and ebook download.
 Anne of Ingleside, book profile on LibraryThing
 L.M. Montgomery Online Formerly the L.M. Montgomery Research Group, this site includes a blog, extensive lists of primary and secondary materials, detailed information about Montgomery's publishing history, and a filmography of screen adaptations of Montgomery texts. See, in particular, the page about Anne of Ingleside.
 The L.M. Montgomery Literary Society This site  includes information about Montgomery's works and life and research from the newsletter, The Shining Scroll.

1939 Canadian novels
Anne of Green Gables books
Novels by Lucy Maud Montgomery
Novels set in Prince Edward Island
1939 children's books
Canadian children's books
Canadian children's novels
McClelland & Stewart books